Hathin is a town and a Municipal Committee in Palwal district of Haryana in India.

Geography 
It lies in NCR region, located 65 kilometres south of Delhi, 10 kilometres west from NH44 and 10 kilometres south from KMP (Western Peripheral Expressway) and the upcoming Haryana Orbital Rail Corridor (HORC) and also 10 kilometres east from longest expressway in India (Delhi-Vadodara-Mumbai Expressway).

Governance 
Hathin is a Haryana Legislative Assembly constituency segment, within the Faridabad Lok Sabha constituency.

History

Circa 150 BCE to 100 CE Shunga Empire or Kushan Empire era Hindu temple guard rail pillars were excavated from a filled well of Bhadas village and from Hathin. The pillars are exhibited in the Haryana State Museum. The railing pillars have images of Yaksha and three mortises carved on them. These pillars may have belonged to the same monument as the lens-shaped mortises because both have the same size, the color of the stone, distances between the three mortises carved on the pillars and yaksha carvings. The yaksha on the Bhadas pillar stands on protome of a Cloven hoofed animal, with the raised right hand (now-broken) holding a flower and the left hand on the hip holding up the drapery. Roundel on top of the pillar is a composite animal with protome of deer and hindquarters of makra superimposed over a lotus in bloom.

On 10 April 1919, Mahatma Gandhi was arrested at Palwal railway station, accused of sedition and jailed.

Infrastructure 
Electricity is provided by DHBVN.

State transport Haryana buses connects the town to Palwal and with cities like Gurgaon, Faridabad, Delhi, Sohna and Chandigarh etc.

An updated Community Health Center provides health facilities.

A new Rest House is under construction.

On 27 May 2015, Haryana chief minister ML Khattar announced a budget of Rs 40 crore (400m) for a four-lane highway project from Palwal to Hathin and a bypass from Hathin to link NH-44. 5 crore to Hathin, 150 crore for improvement of irrigation facilities and improvement of existing government girls school buildings.

Demographics 
The Hathin Municipal Committee has a population of 17,461 of which 10,089 are male and 7,372 are female according to Census India 2011. The population of children ranging from 0-6  is 2,731, which is 15.64% of the total population of Hathin (MC). The female ratio is on par with state average of 879. The child ratio is 820 against a state average of 834. The literacy rate is 71.97% against the state average of 75.55%.

Transport

Rail 

Located  from Hathin, Palwal is the nearest railway station. The station has 10 platforms. It is one of the largest in India. Numerous trains connect Palwal to Delhi. Fast trains are available for longer distances. Women-only trains run between Palwal and Delhi.

Nearest Metro Station to Hathin is Raja Nahar Singh Ballabhgarh located 37 kilometres towards Faridabad.

Education

Schools 
 Govt. Model Sanskriti Sr. Sec. School, Hathin
 Modish Public School, Hathin
 KCM World School, Bhamnola Jogi Hathin
 Shanti Niketan Public School, Hathin
 Tagore Shiksha Niketan Public School, Hathin
 St. John's Public School, Hathin
 Yadav Academy School, Hathin
 Sehrawat Sr. Sec. School, Hathin
 Govt. Model Sanskriti Sr. Sec. School, Buraka Hathin
 Govt. Girls Sr. Sec. School, Hathin 
 Govt. Primary School, Hathin
 New D.P.S, Bhanguri Hathin
 Krishna Public School, Swamika Hathin
 ASM Convent Public School, Hathin
 SR Mewat Public School, Hathin
 St. John's Public School, Rupraka Hathin
 Swami Sarvanand Public School, Hathin
 Sehrawat World School, Hathin

Colleges

 Sehrawat Degree College of Education, Hathin
 Yadav Degree College, Hathin
 Government Industrial Training Institute, Hathin
 Government Polytechnic Uttawar Hathin
 Mewat School of Education, Hathin
 Government College, Hathin (Palwal)

See also 
 Delhi-Mumbai Industrial Corridor Project

References 

Cities and towns in Palwal district